Amon Kotey is a boxer from Ghana. At the 1974 World Amateur Boxing Championships he won the bronze medal in Light Welterweight. Until today the only medal for Ghana at the AIBA World Boxing Championships.

Kotey beat Patricio Diaz (Argentina) and Obisia Nwakpa (Nigeria), before losing to Vladimir Kolev (Bulgaria) in the semi-final.

External links 
 Bio

Ghanaian male boxers
AIBA World Boxing Championships medalists
Possibly living people
Year of birth missing
Light-welterweight boxers